75 Murray Street, also known as the Hopkins Store, is a historic building between West Broadway and Greenwich Street in the TriBeCa neighborhood of Manhattan, New York City. It was built in 1857-58 and features a cast-iron facade in the Venetian Renaissance style from the foundry of James Bogardus, one of the earliest of the few remaining facades created by the self-described inventor of cast-iron architecture.

The original tenants were Francis and John Hopkins, who had a glassware business. Beginning c.1920 the building was the location of Knickerbocker Annunciator, a supplier of elevator traveling cable, electronic cable, and annunciators.

The building was converted to mixed commercial and residential use in 1994–95, at which time it was restored.  It is currently called the Bogardus Mansion and used for events and musical performances.

See also
List of New York City Designated Landmarks in Manhattan below 14th Street
National Register of Historic Places listings in Manhattan below 14th Street

References
Notes

External links 

Borgardus Mansion
Archiplanet.org

Commercial buildings on the National Register of Historic Places in Manhattan
Italianate architecture in New York City
Commercial buildings completed in 1858
New York City Designated Landmarks in Manhattan
James Bogardus buildings
Cast-iron architecture in New York City
Tribeca